The first Sarawak district council elections were held in the end of 1959. It was a multi-tiered system functioned to elect 24 members into Council Negri (now Sarawak State Legislative Assembly).

Background
After Sarawak became a crown colony on 1 July 1947, Sir Charles Aden Clarke, the then governor of Sarawak issued "Notes on the Development
of Local Government in Sarawak". This led to the setting up of local authorities in Sarawak, financed by population-based capitation grants, customary taxes, and
license fees. By 1957, local authorities covered all areas in Sarawak. In 1959, the crown colony government decided to standardise the rates-collecting system for all local authorities in Sarawak. The amount of rates collected was based on property values and matched by one or two-dollar government grants for every dollar collected in rates.

Before the election, the oldest political party in Sarawak, Sarawak United Peoples' Party (SUPP) was founded in June 1959. The next oldest political party Parti Negara Sarawak (PANAS) was only founded in April 1960.

Aftermath
After the elections, all the elected members from 24 local councils started working on 1 January 1960, guided by a handbook on the duties of local authorities and councilors.

References

Sarawak state elections
1959 elections in Malaya